Shor Shor or Shar Shar or Sher Sher may refer to:
 Sher Sher, East Azerbaijan
 Shor Shor, Lorestan
 Shor Shor, Razavi Khorasan
 Shor and Shorshor, 1926 Soviet film